Ağaçlı is a Turkic word meaning "(place) with trees" and may refer to:

 Ağaçlı, Ceyhan, a village in the district of Ceyhan, Adana Province, Turkey
 Ağaçlı, Gerger, a village in the district of Gerger, Adıyaman Province, Turkey
 Ağaçlı, Karayazı
 Ağaçlı, Kulp
 Ağaçlı, Söke, a village in the district of Söke, Aydın Province, Turkey